The St. Paul Curling Club (SPCC) is an historic curling club located in Saint Paul, Minnesota, United States, on Selby Avenue. It is the curling club with the largest active membership in the United States at over 1200 members. It was first established in 1885, and the present St. Paul CC was established when the Capitol City Curling Club and Nushka Curling Club merged in 1912. It is the oldest curling club in Minnesota. The club hosted the 2011 World Mixed Doubles Curling Championship and the 2011 World Senior Curling Championships in April 2011.

History
The first St. Paul Curling Club was incorporated on November 16, 1885. The first curling game held in St. Paul were played on the Mississippi River. The St. Paul Curling Club built its first facilities on Raspberry Island in 1891, and became a part of the Northwest Curling Association along with other clubs from Minnesota, Wisconsin, North Dakota and Illinois a year later. The original St. Paul CC closed in 1904 and was replaced by the Capitol City CC the next year. However, the Capitol City CC and the Nushka CC merged to form the new St. Paul CC in 1912, and permanent facilities were set up at a two-story clubhouse with eight sheets of natural ice on Selby Avenue. Artificial ice was added in gradual stages from 1939–1947.

The Metro League and the Mixed League were formed in 1961 and 1962 to attract more curlers, but club membership dropped in the 1960s and 1970s, and there were discussions on disbandment. The club remained, though, and continued to renovate and expand its facilities. The club hosted the men's nationals in 1988, becoming the first club in the US to host every national curling championship event.

Leagues
The St. Paul Curling Club has a number of different curling leagues. All are club leagues.

Club champions
The club championship is held annually.

Famous members
Allison Pottinger – 2003 World Champion, 1996, 1999, and 2006 World Championships runner-up, 2010 Olympian, 2011 US Nationals runner-up
John Benton – 2009 US Men's National Champion, 2010 Olympian
Margie Smith

References

External links
St. Paul Curling Club
St. Paul Curling Club at MNopedia
Photographs at the Minnesota Historical Society

1885 establishments in Minnesota
Curling clubs in the United States
Sports in Saint Paul, Minnesota
Curling in Minnesota
Curling clubs established in 1885